The Korg MS2000 is a virtual analog synthesizer produced by the Japanese electronic musical instrument manufacturer Korg.

History and features

The synthesizer was offered as either a 44-key board or as a rack module, the latter being controlled by an external keyboard controller, hardware sequencer or a computer, making use of the system's very complete MIDI implementation. It was intended to bring the sound and basic functionality of the MS-10 and MS-20 back into the keyboard market, but with the updated technology of Virtual Analog Synthesis. The extensive number of onboard knobs and buttons (over 80) could be used to dynamically edit many of the parameters while playing, as well as be used as a control surface for other synthesizers and sound modules. This capability was the attraction of many analog synthesizers of the past and that real-time editability became the cornerstone of contemporary VA synthesizers.

At the time of the release of the MS2000, Korg was competing directly with synthesizers such as the Clavia Nord Lead and Roland's JP-8000 and JP-8080. While both of these VA machines were powerful in their own right, they were expensive. Korg had to make some sacrifices to be able to offer the much simpler MS2000 at a more reasonable price. The most prominent limitation was the synthesizer's polyphony of only 4 voices.

One feature partially overcame the limited polyphony. If one connected the rack and keyboard together via the MIDI ports, the two devices could be set to produce notes offset to one another, this turning the combined system into a semi-8-voice synthesizer, completely controllable using either of the control surfaces, although it was likely that most players used the keyboard surface as the master control.

Synthesis
Sounds are initiated in the MS2000 in a somewhat standard synthesizer manner, and then routed in various ways to produce the final sound. All sounds (timbres) in the MS2000 consist of the following steps and path: OSC1/OSC2/NOISE, MIXER, FILTER, AMP, EG, LFO, VIRTUAL PATCH, MOD SEQUENCE, EFFECTS and ARPEGGIATOR. If the voice mode is Single, only TIMBRE 1 will sound. If the voice mode is Dual or Split, both timbres TIMBRE 1 and TIMBRE 2 will sound.

TIMBRE 1/2
OSC1/OSC2/NOISE
OSC1 (Oscillator 1) allows one to select from eight different oscillator algorithms, including basic analog synthesizer waveforms such as SAW and PWM, Cross Modulation, a Noise Generator, and Korg's proprietary DWGS (Digital Waveform Generator System) originally developed for the Korg DW-8000 synthesizer. The DWGS waveforms allow the creation of bell and electric piano-like sounds. The Noise Generator produces white noise which can be used for sound effects and introducing harmonic distortions to waveforms. An external signal such as a mic, instrument or line input from the AUDIO IN 1/2 jacks can also be processed.

OSC2 (Oscillator 2) allows one to select from three types: SAW, SQU, and TRI. It can also be used as an oscillator for Ring Modulation or Sync, which are available as modulation destinations to generate sweep and vintage lead sounds.
MIXER
Used for adjusting the levels of OSC1, OSC2 and NOISE. The combined signal is then sent to the FILTER.

FILTER
The FILTER cuts or emphasizes frequency components of the signal from the oscillator, affecting tone and brightness. Three primary types of filtering are available: –12 or –24 dB/oct LPF (Low Pass Filter), –12 dB/oct BPF (Band Pass Filter), or –12 dB/oct HPF (High Pass Filter). Using EG1 to create time-variant changes in cutoff frequency adds a fourth type of filtering.

AMP
The AMP stage consists of AMP (Amplifier), DIST (Distortion), and PAN (Panpot). AMP sets the volume, and PAN sets the sound's location in the stereo field. Using EG2 can create time-variant changes in volume. Quite harsh tones can be created by turning DIST on, and adjusting the filter cutoff and resonance, higher-pitched rings and tonalities are created with various harmonics layered on.

EG1/2
The Envelope Generator applies a time-variant change to each timbre parameter. On the MS2000/MS2000R, there are two standard ADSR envelope generators for each timbre. EG1 is assigned as the envelope source that produces time variant changes in the FILTER cutoff frequency, while EG2 is assigned as the envelope source that produces time variant changes in the AMP volume. The MS2000's VIRTUAL PATCH module can be used to assign EG1 and EG2 to other parameters.

 
LFO 1/2
The LFO (Low Frequency Oscillator) applies cyclic change to sound parameters. The MS2000/MS2000R provides two LFO’s for each timbre, each with four waveforms. LFO1 is assigned as the modulation source for OSC1. LFO2 is assigned as the modulation source for the pitch modulation controlled by the modulation wheel. As with the EG's, VIRTUAL PATCH can be used to assign LFO1 and LFO2 to other parameters.

VIRTUAL PATCH
VIRTUAL PATCH allows the use of not only EG or LFO, but even keyboard velocity (keyboard playing dynamics) or keyboard tracking (the area of the keyboard that is played) as modulation sources which can be assigned to sound parameters for greater freedom in timbre editing and sound creating. Four routings (combinations) can be specified for each timbre.

MOD SEQUENCE
MOD SEQUENCE is a step sequencer that lets you apply time-variant change to various sound parameters in a way similar to analog synthesizers of the past. The sixteen knobs on the main panel can be used to set the value of each step and then the sequence is played back. The sound can be further modulated by the arpeggiator and by VIRTUAL PATCH. The knobs can also be operated in realtime, and their movements (parameter values) recorded in each step (Motion Rec function). Since each timbre can have up to three sequences, very complex tonal changes can be obtained.

EFFECTS
Each program can have a modulation effect, chorus, stereo delay, and equalization. For a modulation-type effect, select from chorus or stereo delay.

ARPEGGIATOR
The onboard arpeggiator has six types of arpeggio. For a program whose voice mode is Dual/Split, arpeggios can be played on one or both timbres. Since arpeggiator settings can be made for each program, arpeggio types that are suitable for the sound of a particular timbre can be saved and played.

Models

MS2000/MS2000R. In 2000, Korg introduced the MS2000 and MS2000R, the latter being a rack-mounted version of the MS2000. The MS2000 is a 44-key keyboard with modulation and pitch-bend wheels, two analog inputs and two analog outputs, all via 1/4" TRS connections and MIDI IN, OUT and THRU connections. The case was painted a dark teal blue color and sided with mahogany rails. In addition to its body, the signal path and parameter list was silk-screened on the face (MS2000 model only), a retro nod to analog synthesizers of the 1970s and 1980s. A 19" rack version was simultaneously released, with a designation of "R" added to the name.

MS2000B/MS2000BR
In 2003, Korg re-released the synthesizer with some minor changes. The new version was dubbed the "MS2000B", the "B" designation given due to its dark grey/black painted body. A few additional patches and demo programs were loaded, but the most significant improvement was the inclusion of a microphone which could be inserted into the new mic input that was added to the top of the keyboard to facilitate easier use of the vocoder. An identically-capable rack version was also released, with the appropriate "R" designation in the name. It did not come equipped with the mic or mic input, but the vocoder could still be used via one of its audio inputs.

Specifications and options

Tone generation system
Analog modeling synthesis system

Synth programs: Multi-timbral capability: maximum two timbres (for Split/Dual), 4 voices, 2 oscillators and a noise generator, EG x 2, LFO x 2, virtual patch x 4, MOD sequence (maximum 16 steps x 3)
Vocoder programs: 4 voices, 1 oscillator + noise generator, EG x 2, LFO x 2, 16 channel vocoder, adjustable level and pan for each channel, Formant
Shift function
DWGS (Digital Waveform Generator System)
FM Synthesis is also possible via Virtual patching

Tone generator
2 Timbres per patch, can mix synthesis types
4 voice, 2 oscillator + noise generator (Single mode)
4 voice, 4 oscillator + 2 noise generator (Dual mode, can also be unison).
4 voice, 4 oscillator split mode
1 voice, 4 oscillator monophonic mode (can be combined with unison)

Keyboard (MS2000 only)
44 notes

Effects
Modulation effect (3 types), delay (3 types), equalizer

Arpeggiator
6 types
Programmable with sequencer

Programs
16 programs x 8 (total 128 programs)

Inputs
AUDIO IN 1 jack: Input impedance 39 KΩ; Maximum input level: –3.5 [dBu] (AUDIO IN [1/INST] knob: Max); Source impedance 600 Ω
AUDIO IN 2 jack (with MIC/LINE switch):
AUDIO IN 2 [LINE]: Input impedance 39 KΩ; Maximum input level: –3.5 [dBu] (AUDIO IN [2/VOICE] knob: Max); Source impedance 600 Ω
AUDIO IN 2 [MIC]: Input impedance 22 KΩ; Maximum input level: –33 [dBu] (AUDIO IN [2/VOICE] knob: Max); Source impedance 600 Ω

Outputs
L/MONO, R jacks: Output impedance 1.1 KΩ (MONO: 550 Ω); Maximum output level +6.5 [dBu]; Load impedance 100 KΩ
Headphone jack: Output impedance 10 Ω; Maximum output level 35 [mW]; Load impedance 33 Ω

Control inputs
ASSIGNABLE PEDAL jack
ASSIGNABLE SW jack

MIDI
IN, OUT, THRU connectors

Display
16 character (8 ´ 5 pixel) ´ 2 line LCD module (with backlight)

Power supply
DC 9V, 8 W

Dimensions
MS2000: 737.8 (W) ´ 371.3 (D) ´ 147.7 (H) mm
MS2000R: 482.0 (W) ´ 233.2 (D) ´ 87.1 (H) mm (5U rack space)

Weight
MS2000: 7.1 kg
MS2000R: 2.8 kg

Included Items
AC adapter (DC9V)
Washers ´4, Bushing ´4, Screws ´4 (MS2000R only)

Options
EXP-2 expression pedal
XVP-10 EXP/VOL pedal
PS-1 pedal switch
DS-1H damper pedal

References

Further reading

MS2000
Virtual analog synthesizers
Polyphonic synthesizers
Digital synthesizers